Dipen J. Parekh (born in Mumbai, India) is Chief Operating Officer at the University of Miami Health System, Chairman of Urology and the Dr. Victor Politano Endowed Chair in Clinical Urology at the Miller School of Medicine at University of Miami in Miami. He also serves as the Director of Robotic surgery at the University of Miami Health System . In 2012, he was awarded the American Urological Association Gold Cystoscope Award for his excellence in "establishing programs in urologic oncology and robotic surgery and outstanding contributions in transformative research".

Personal life 
A native of Gujarat, India Parekh completed his MBBS at University of Poona, graduating in 1991. He underwent post graduate training in General Surgery (1995) and super-specialized in Urology (1998) from University of Mumbai. He completed his residency (2004) in Urology from Vanderbilt University Medical Center and a fellowship (2006) at Memorial Sloan-Kettering Cancer Center in New York. He also has a Masters in Healthcare Administration (2012) from Trinity University, Texas.

Robotic surgery 
He served as the Doctors Hospital at Renaissance Distinguished University Chair in Urology and Chief of Robotic Surgery and Urologic Oncology at the University of Texas Health Science Center in San Antonio from 2007 to 2012.

In 2018, Parekh published the results of a clinical trial comparing Robotic Cystectomy vs. Open Cystectomy (RAZOR) in the medical journal The Lancet. The RAZOR trial provided high evidence that robotic surgery is non-inferior to traditional surgery for bladder cancer.

Other Contributions 
When performing partial nephrectomy, many surgeons clamp the renal artery. Urologic dogma has been that every minute of clamp time is detrimental to long-term kidney function. Therefore, Parekh led a study investigating this by performing biopsies on clamped kidneys and found no significant long-term effects with up to 60 minutes of ischemia.

References 

American surgeons
Indian emigrants to the United States
Vanderbilt University alumni
University of Miami faculty
American roboticists
American urologists
American medical researchers
1960 births
Living people
American businesspeople
Prostate cancer
American people of Indian descent in health professions
Place of birth missing (living people)